Jackson Hunter Miller (born April 30, 1967) is an American politician. From 2006 to 2018, he served in the Virginia House of Delegates representing the 50th district, made up of the city of Manassas and part of Prince William County in the suburbs of Washington, D.C. He is a member of the Republican Party, and was the House majority whip from 2012 to 2018.  In the 2017 elections, Miller was defeated by Democratic socialist challenger Lee J. Carter in what was considered a upset.

Miller has served on the House committees on Commerce and Labor (2010–2018), Courts of Justice (2008–2018), General Laws (2008–2009), Privileges and Elections (2007–2018), and Science and Technology (2007–2009).

Early life, education
Miller was born in Washington, D.C. He attended W.T. Woodson High School in Fairfax County, Virginia, graduating in 1985. He received a B.S. degree in urban planning from Virginia Commonwealth University in 1990.

He served in the United States Army Reserve 1989–1999, attaining the rank of captain.

Electoral history
In May 2004 Miller ran for a four-year term on the nonpartisan Manassas city council. In a race for three available seats, he finished third among four candidates.

On March 28, 2006, 84-year-old Republican Delegate Harry J. Parrish died, leaving the 50th House district seat vacant. Miller ran as the Republican nominee, replacing Parrish in a special election held together with the November congressional election. He lost his seat in 2017 to a member of the Democratic Socialists of America. Many regard his loss as the biggest surprise of Virginia's 2017 election cycle due to his opponent's lack of party support.

Notes

External links
 (campaign finance)

1967 births
Living people
Republican Party members of the Virginia House of Delegates
Virginia Commonwealth University alumni
People from Manassas, Virginia
Military personnel from Washington, D.C.
21st-century American politicians
Wilbert Tucker Woodson High School alumni